Vernor Steffen Vinge (born October 2, 1944) is an American science fiction author and retired professor. He taught mathematics and computer science at San Diego State University. He is the first wide-scale popularizer of the technological singularity concept and perhaps the first to present a fictional "cyberspace". He has won the Hugo Award for his novels A Fire Upon the Deep (1992), A Deepness in the Sky (1999), Rainbows End (2006),  and novellas Fast Times at Fairmont High (2002), and The Cookie Monster (2004).

Life and work
Vinge published his first short story, "Apartness", in the June 1965 issue of the British magazine New Worlds. His second, "Bookworm, Run!", was in the March 1966 issue of Analog Science Fiction, then edited by John W. Campbell. The story explores the theme of artificially augmented intelligence by connecting the brain directly to computerised data sources. He became a moderately prolific contributor to SF magazines in the 1960s and early 1970s. In 1969, he expanded the story "Grimm's Story" (Orbit 4, 1968) into his first novel, Grimm's World. His second novel, The Witling, was published in 1976.

Vinge came to prominence in 1981 with his novella True Names, perhaps the first story to present a fully fleshed-out concept of cyberspace, which would later be central to cyberpunk stories by William Gibson, Neal Stephenson and others. His next two novels, The Peace War (1984) and Marooned in Realtime (1986), explore the spread of a future libertarian society, and deal with the impact of a technology which can create impenetrable force fields called 'bobbles'. These books built Vinge's reputation as an author who would explore ideas to their logical conclusions in particularly inventive ways. Both books were nominated for the Hugo Award, but lost to novels by William Gibson and Orson Scott Card.

Vinge won the Hugo Award (tying for Best Novel with Doomsday Book by Connie Willis) with his 1992 novel, A Fire Upon the Deep. A Deepness in the Sky (1999) was a prequel to Fire, following competing groups of humans in The Slow Zone as they struggle over who has the rights to exploit a technologically emerging alien culture. Deepness won the Hugo Award for Best Novel in 2000.

His novellas Fast Times at Fairmont High and The Cookie Monster also won Hugo Awards in 2002 and 2004, respectively.

Vinge's 2006 novel Rainbows End, set in the same universe and featuring some of the same characters as Fast Times at Fairmont High, won the 2007 Hugo Award for Best Novel. In 2011, he released The Children of the Sky, a sequel to A Fire Upon the Deep set approximately 10 years following the end of A Fire Upon the Deep.

Vinge retired in 2000 from teaching at San Diego State University, in order to write full-time. Most years, since its inception in 1999, Vinge has been on the Free Software Foundation's selection committee for their Award for the Advancement of Free Software. Vernor Vinge was Writer Guest of Honor at ConJosé, the 60th World Science Fiction Convention in 2002.

Personal life
His former wife, Joan D. Vinge, is also a science fiction author. They were married from 1972 to 1979.

Bibliography

Novels

Realtime/Bobble series
 The Peace War (1984)  — Hugo Award nominee, 1985
 Marooned in Realtime (1986)  — Prometheus Award winner, Hugo Award nominee, 1987

Zones of Thought series
 A Fire Upon the Deep (1992) — Hugo Award winner, 1993; Nebula Award nominee, 1992; Campbell and Locus SF Awards nominee, 1993
 A Deepness in the Sky (1999) — Hugo, Campbell, and Prometheus Awards winner, 2000; Nebula Award nominee, 1999; Clarke and Locus SF Awards nominee, 2000
 The Children of the Sky (2011)

Standalone novels
 Grimm's World (1969), expanded as Tatja Grimm's World (1987)
 The Witling (1976)
 Rainbows End (2006)  — Hugo and Locus SF Awards winner, 2007; Campbell Award nominee, 2007

Collections
 Across Realtime (1986) 
 The Peace War
 "The Ungoverned"
 Marooned in Realtime
 True Names ... and Other Dangers (1987) 
 "Bookworm, Run!"
 "True Names" (1981, winner 2007 Prometheus Hall of Fame Award)
 "The Peddler's Apprentice" (with Joan D. Vinge)
 "The Ungoverned" (occurs in the same milieu as The Peace War and Marooned in Realtime)
 "Long Shot"
 Threats... and Other Promises (1988)  (These two volumes collect Vinge's short fiction through the late 1980s.)
 "Apartness"
 "Conquest by Default" (occurs in the same milieu as "Apartness")
 "The Whirligig of Time"
 "Gemstone"
 "Just Peace" (with William Rupp)
 "Original Sin"
 "The Blabber" (occurs in the same milieu as A Fire Upon the Deep)
 True Names and the Opening of the Cyberspace Frontier (2001)  (contains "True Names" plus essays by others)
 "Bookworm, Run!"
 "The Accomplice"
 "The Peddler's Apprentice" (with Joan D. Vinge)
 "The Ungoverned"
 "Long Shot"
 "Apartness"
 "Conquest by Default"
 "The Whirligig of Time"
 "Bomb Scare"
 "The Science Fair"
 "Gemstone"
 "Just Peace" (with William Rupp)
 "Original Sin"
 "The Blabber"
 "Win a Nobel Prize!" (originally published in Nature, Vol 407 No 6805 "Futures")
 "The Barbarian Princess" (this is also the first section of "Tatja Grimm's World")
 "Fast Times at Fairmont High" (occurs in the same milieu as Rainbows End; winner 2002 Hugo Award for Best Novella)

Essays
 "The Coming Technological Singularity: How to Survive in the Post-Human Era" (1993), Whole Earth Review
 "2020 Computing: The creativity machine" (2006), Nature
 "The Disaster Stack" (2017) Chasing Shadows

Uncollected short fiction
 "A Dry Martini" (The 60th World Science Fiction Convention ConJosé Restaurant Guide, page 60)
 "The Cookie Monster" (Analog Science Fiction, October 2003) (winner 2004 Hugo Award for Best Novella)
 "Synthetic Serendipity", IEEE Spectrum Online, 30 June 2004
 "A Preliminary Assessment of the Drake Equation, Being an Excerpt from the Memoirs of Star Captain Y.-T. Lee" (2010) (Gateways: Original New Stories Inspired by Frederik Pohl, 2010)
"BFF's first adventure", (originally published in Nature, Vol 518 No 7540 "Futures")
"Legale", (originally published in Nature, Vol 548 No 7666 "Futures")

References

External links

About Vinge
 
 Vernor Vinge, at Worlds Without End
  official website

Essays and speeches
 The Coming Technological Singularity: How to Survive in the Post-Human Era, 1993
 Accelerating Change 2005: Vernor Vinge Keynote Address (64 kbit/s MP3 audio recording, 40 minutes long)
 Seminars About Long-term Thinking: Vernor Vinge (Summary and MP3 audio recording of a 2007 speech, 91 minutes long)
 "2020 Computing: The creativity machine", from Nature magazine, 23 March 2006.
 Vernor Vinge's keynote address at the 2006 Austin Games Conference.

Interviews
 Interview on Fresh Air, 2000 (audio)
 Interviews on the podcast series The Future and You: April 8, 2006, May 1, 2006 (audio)
 Interview by Glenn Reynolds and Helen Smith, April 26, 2006 (podcast)
 Interview by Reason, 2007
 Interview for the singularity symposium, 2011 (podcast)

1944 births
Living people
20th-century American novelists
21st-century American novelists
American male novelists
American science fiction writers
American technology writers
American computer scientists
Writers from California
Novelists from Wisconsin
Hugo Award-winning writers
People from Waukesha, Wisconsin
Mathematics educators
San Diego State University faculty
American male short story writers
American transhumanists
20th-century American short story writers
21st-century American short story writers
Singularitarians
20th-century American male writers
21st-century American male writers
21st-century American non-fiction writers
American male non-fiction writers
University of California, San Diego alumni
Inkpot Award winners